Operation Washing was the successful destruction of the railway bridge over the Asopos River in Central Greece by four British SOE saboteurs. It took place on 21 June 1943, as part of Operation Animals.

References

Sources
 

Conflicts in 1943
1943 in Greece
Acts of sabotage
Central Greece in World War II
Special Operations Executive operations
History of Phthiotis
Mount Oeta
June 1943 events